This is a list of 163 species in Notiphila, a genus of shore flies in the family Ephydridae.

Notiphila species

N. abdita Cogan, 1968
N. adusta Mathis, 1979
N. aenea Waltl, 1837
N. affinis Waltl, 1837
N. albiventris (Wiedemann, 1824)
N. alboclavata Bigot, 1888
N. ambata Cogan, 1968
N. ancudensis Cresson, 1931
N. andrana Cogan, 1968
N. annulata Fallén, 1813
N. annulipes Stenhammar, 1844
N. aquatica Becker, 1896
N. asiatica Krivosheina, 1998
N. atrata Mathis, 1979
N. atripes Cresson, 1917
N. australis Loew, 1860
N. avia Loew, 1878
N. bella Loew, 1862
N. bicolor Waltl, 1837
N. bicornuta Bock, 1988
N. bipunctata Loew, 1862
N. biseriata Cresson, 1917
N. bispinosa Cresson, 1917
N. bivittata Cogan, 1968
N. brasiliensis Walker, 1856
N. brunnipes (Robineau-Desvoidy, 1830)
N. cana Cresson, 1947
N. canescens Miyagi, 1966
N. carbonaria Walker, 1865
N. carinata Loew, 1862
N. caudata Fallén, 1813
N. cinerea Fallén, 1813
N. cogani Canzoneri & Meneghini, 1979
N. cressoni Mathis, 1979
N. decorata Williston, 1896
N. decoris Williston, 1893
N. deonieri Mathis, 1979
N. deserta Mathis, 1979
N. dimidiaticornis Giordani Soika, 1956
N. dorsata Stenhammar, 1844
N. dorsopunctata Wiedemann, 1824
N. eleomyia Mathis, 1979
N. elophila Mathis, 1979
N. erythrocera Loew, 1878
N. exotica Wiedemann, 1830
N. ezoensis Miyagi, 1966
N. fasciata (Wiedemann, 1824)
N. flava Dahl, 1973
N. flavoantennata Krivosheina, 1998
N. floridensis Cresson, 1917
N. footei Mathis, 1979
N. freyi Krivosheina, 2001
N. frigidicola Cogan, 1968
N. frontalis Coquillett, 1904
N. fulvimana Cresson, 1917
N. furcata (Coquillett, 1902)
N. fuscimana Malloch, 1925
N. fuscofacies Cogan, 1968
N. graecula Becker, 1926 
N. hamifera Wheeler, 1961
N. ignobilis Loew, 1862
N. imperomana Mathis, 1995
N. impunctata Meijere, 1908
N. indica Krivosheina, 2001
N. indistincta Krivosheina, 2001
N. insularis Grimshaw, 1901
N. iranica Canzoneri & Meneghini, 1979
N. irrorata Cogan, 1968
N. juncea Dahl, 1973
N. kentensis Huryn, 1987
N. kenyaensis Cresson, 1947
N. latelimbata Curran, 1930
N. latigena Mathis, 1979
N. latigenis Hendel, 1914
N. lenae Krivosheina, 1998
N. lineata Giordani Soika, 1956
N. littorea Waltl, 1837
N. loewi Cresson, 1917
N. lunicornis Giordani Soika, 1956
N. lyalli Cogan, 1968
N. lyra Krivosheina, 1998
N. macrochaeta Loew, 1878
N. maculata Stenhammar, 1844
N. major Stenhammar, 1844
N. maritima Krivosheina, 1998
N. mathisi Huryn, 1984
N. meridionalis (Rondani, 1856)
N. microscopa Cogan, 1968
N. mima Canzoneri & Meneghini, 1979
N. minima Cresson, 1917
N. montalentii Canzoneri & Rampini, 1994
N. montana Cogan, 1968
N. nanosoma Mathis, 1979
N. nigra (Robineau-Desvoidy, 1830)
N. nigricornis Stenhammar, 1844
N. nigrina Krivosheina, 2001
N. nigripes Waltl, 1837
N. nosata Krivosheina, 2001
N. nubila Dahl, 1973
N. nudipes Cresson, 1917
N. obscuricornis Loew, 1862
N. oksanae Krivosheina & Ozerov, 2015
N. olivacea Cresson, 1917
N. omercooperi Cogan, 1968
N. oriens Mathis, 1979
N. pallicornis Mathis, 1979
N. pallidipalpis Cresson, 1940
N. paludia Mathis, 1979
N. pauroura Mathis, 1979
N. phaea Hendel, 1914
N. phaeopsis Mathis, 1979
N. philippinensis Cresson, 1948
N. picta Fallén, 1813
N. pokuma Cresson, 1947
N. poliosoma Mathis, 1979
N. pollinosa Krivosheina, 1998
N. posticata Meigen, 1830
N. pseudobscuricornis Giordani Soika, 1956
N. pseudodimiaticornis Giordani Soika, 1956
N. puberula Krivosheina, 2001
N. pulchra Mathis, 1979
N. pulchrifrons Loew, 1872
N. puncta Meijere, 1911
N. quadrimaculata Dahl, 1973
N. quadrisetosa Thomson, 1869
N. riparia Meigen, 1830
N. robusta Mathis, 1979
N. rufitarsis Macquart, 1851
N. scalaris Loew, 1862
N. scoliochaeta Mathis, 1979
N. scutellata Krivosheina, 2001
N. sekiyai Koizumi, 1949
N. semimaculata Becker, 1926
N. setigera Becker, 1903
N. setosa Krivosheina, 2001
N. shewelli Mathis, 1979
N. sicca Cresson, 1940
N. simalurensis Meijere, 1916
N. similis Meijere, 1908
N. solita Walker, 1853
N. spinosa Cresson, 1948
N. splendens Macquart, 1851
N. stagnicola (Robineau-Desvoidy, 1830)
N. sternalis Thomson, 1869
N. striata Williston, 1897
N. stuckenbergi Cogan, 1968
N. subnigra Krivosheina, 1998
N. supposita Collin, 1911
N. swarabica Cogan, 1968
N. taenia Mathis, 1979
N. teres Cresson, 1931
N. theonae Huryn, 1984
N. transversa Walker, 1853
N. triangulifera Schiner, 1868
N. tschungseni Canzoneri, 1993
N. uliginosa Haliday, 1839
N. umbrosa Drake, 2001
N. unicolor Loew, 1862
N. unilineata Walker, 1865
N. venusta Loew, 1856
N. virgata Coquillett, 1900

References

Notiphila